East Dunbartonshire is a county constituency of the House of Commons of the Parliament of the United Kingdom (Westminster). It elects one Member of Parliament (MP) by the first past the post system of election. The seat is possibly best known for formerly being the constituency of Jo Swinson, the former Leader of the Liberal Democrats who was defeated at the 2019 general election. 
The current MP for the constituency is Amy Callaghan of the Scottish National Party (SNP).

The current constituency was first used at the 2005 general election. There was also an earlier East Dunbartonshire constituency, from 1950 to 1983.

Constituency profile
The constituency covers the northern edge of Greater Glasgow, and includes commuter towns on the North Clyde and Croy railway corridors.

Since 1974, the constituency has had the unusual distinction of having been represented by all four of the main political parties in Scotland, typically with small majorities (under 10%) at each general election.

Boundaries

Current 
The existing constituency was created as a result of the Fifth Periodical Review of the Boundary Commission for Scotland, as one of two covering the East Dunbartonshire council area and one of five covering the East Dunbartonshire council area and the North Lanarkshire council area.

The East Dunbartonshire constituency is entirely within the East Dunbartonshire council area, and the rest of the council area is covered by the Cumbernauld, Kilsyth and Kirkintilloch East constituency, which also covers part of the North Lanarkshire council area. The rest of the North Lanarkshire area is covered by the Airdrie and Shotts, Coatbridge, Chryston and Bellshill,  and  Motherwell and Wishaw constituencies.

The East Dunbartonshire constituency replaced most of the Strathkelvin and Bearsden constituency and some of the Clydebank and Milngavie constituency and some of the Coatbridge and Chryston constituency.

The Fifth Periodical Review did not affect the boundaries of Scottish Parliament constituencies, which retain the boundaries of Westminster constituencies prior to implementation of the results of the review.

Historic 
The historic constituency was created under the House of Commons (Redistribution of Seats) Act 1949, and first used in the 1950 general election.

As created in 1950, the constituency was one of two covering the county of Dunbarton. The other was West Dunbartonshire. The two new constituencies replaced the earlier constituencies of Dunbartonshire and Dumbarton Burghs.

East Dunbartonshire covered the Cumbernauld, Kirkintilloch, and New Kilpatrick districts of the county and the burghs of Clydebank, Kirkintilloch, and Milngavie.

For the 1951 general election the constituency boundaries were adjusted to take account of a change to the boundaries of the burgh of Clydebank.

The results of the First Periodical Review of the Boundary Commission were implemented for the 1955 general election, but there was no change to the boundaries of East Dunbartonshire, and the boundaries of 1951 and 1955 were used also in the general elections of 1959, 1964, 1966 and 1970.

The results of the Second Periodical Review were implemented for the February 1974 general election. The review took account of population growth in the county of Dunbarton, caused by overspill from the city of Glasgow into the new town of Cumbernauld and elsewhere, and East Dunbartonshire became one of three constituencies covering the county. East Dunbartonshire now covered the Kirkintilloch and Cumbernauld districts of the county and the burghs of Bearsden, Cumbernauld, and Kirkintilloch, but it lost Clydebank and Milngavie to the new constituency of Central Dunbartonshire.  These boundaries were used also for the general elections of October 1974 and 1979.

In 1975, under the Local Government (Scotland) Act 1973, Scottish counties were abolished in favour of regions and districts and islands council areas, and the county of  Dunbarton was divided between several districts of the new region of Strathclyde. The Third Periodical Review took account of new local government boundaries, and the results were implemented for the 1983 general election.

Members of Parliament

Election results

Elections in the 2010s

 

This was the largest constituency turnout, and the smallest SNP majority, at the 2019 general election.

1 This was the highest turnout in the May 2015 general election.

Elections in the 2000s

 

The constituency of 1950 to 1983 has an unusual electoral history, in that in two consecutive general elections it was gained by the party in third place at the previous election. In October 1974 the SNP leapfrogged Labour to defeat the Conservatives, and in 1979 Labour leapfrogged the Conservatives to beat the SNP. Furthermore, the constituency went the opposite way to the nation in two consecutive changes of government.  In February 1974, the Conservatives gained it from Labour, though losing nationally, while in 1979 Labour regained the seat from the SNP, though losing nationally. Apart from Ynys Môn in Wales, East Dunbartonshire is the only seat to have been represented by the three main parties and the nationalists.

Elections in the 1970s

The October 1974 result was particularly unusual since it produced both the smallest majority in the country at that election, and the closest three-way result since 1945.

Elections in the 1960s

Elections in the 1950s

References 

Westminster Parliamentary constituencies in Scotland
Constituencies of the Parliament of the United Kingdom established in 1950
Constituencies of the Parliament of the United Kingdom disestablished in 1983
Constituencies of the Parliament of the United Kingdom established in 2005
Historic parliamentary constituencies in Scotland (Westminster)
Politics of East Dunbartonshire
Jo Swinson